Megachile duala is a species of bee in the family Megachilidae., described by Strand in 1914.

References

Duala
Insects described in 1914